Mitchell Higginbotham (March 2, 1921 – February 14, 2016) was a U.S. Army Air Force officer who was a member of the African American World War II fighter group known as the Tuskegee Airmen.

Biography

Early life
Higginbotham was born on March 2, 1921  in Amherst, Virginia, to Plinkam L Higginbotham and Hester Higginbotham. He has a younger brother, Robert, who also became a member of the U.S. military.

Military career
Higginbotham joined the U.S. military in the summer 1942.  He subsequently was accepted into the Tuskegee Army Airfield Class TE-44-K from which he graduated on February 1, 1945, with a commission as a Second Lieutenant.  Higginbotham became one of the original members of the Tuskegee Airmen when he was assigned to the 477th Bombardment Group. He served on active duty through the end of World War II; in 1946, he left active duty but continued as a member of the U.S. Army Air Force Reserves. He initially flew fighter aircraft but eventually moved up to flying B-52s.

Higginbotham's younger brother Robert also joined the military during World War II two years after his older brother; however, Robert Higginbotham became a pilot for the Navy Air Corps.

Higginbotham was one of 100 black servicemen who were arrested for attempting to enter an officers club reserved for white officers.  This event became known as the Freeman Field Mutiny; it is widely seen as a key moment in the path towards full integration of the U.S. Armed Services.

Civilian career
Following his years of active duty, Higginbotham went to work for the Los Angeles Airport Advisory Committee, working as a registrar at the Pittsburg Airport.  He also served as a probation officer for nearly thirty years.

Awards
Higginbotham and his brother Robert both attended the ceremony in 2007 where the Congressional Gold Medal was collectively presented to the Tuskegee Airmen for their contributions during World War II. He also received "Man of the Year" Award from the Los Angeles Chapter of the Tuskegee Airmen, Inc in 1996.

See also
477th Bomber Group
Freeman Field Mutiny
Tuskegee Airmen

Further reading

Articles

Archival resources
 Mitchell Higginbotham Papers (6.25 linear feet) are housed in the Special Collections & Archives of the University of California, Riverside Libraries.

References

External links
 Los Angeles Chapter, Tuskegee Airmen, Inc.
 Tuskegee Airmen at Tuskegee University
 Tuskegee Airmen Archives at the University of California, Riverside Libraries.
 Tuskegee Airman from Sewickley reflects on obstacles
 Tuskegee Airmen, Inc.
 Tuskegee Airmen National Historic Site (U.S. National Park Service) 
 Tuskegee Airmen National Museum

1921 births
2016 deaths
People from Amherst, Virginia
Tuskegee Airmen
African-American aviators
21st-century African-American people